The Kerouartz family is one of the oldest noble families in Brittany. It originated with the English knight Auralus Houart Miles, sent by the English king in 1164 to assist Conan IV, Duke of Brittany. Auralus built the castle 'Ker-Houart', later renamed 'Kerouartz' - it was initially built in Landéda parish but after being destroyed several times by the English it was re-sited to Lannilis about 3 km away. The castle was seized as national property when the family emigrated during the French Revolution and sold. One of the family's later members was the Royalist naval officer Alain-François Le Borgne de Keruzoret.

Sources
http://gallica.bnf.fr/ark:/12148/bpt6k5816873q/f49.image

History of Brittany
French noble families